Ethylenedinitramine (EDNA, also Haleite or Explosive H) is an explosive chemical compound of the nitroamine class, a derivative of the ethylenediamine.

Ednatol is a high explosive comprising about 58% ethylenedinitramine and 42% TNT.

References

Explosive chemicals
Nitroamines